Prosthetics and Orthotics International is a peer-reviewed academic journal that publishes papers in the field of orthopedics. The journal's editor-in-chief is Dr. David Boone (Orthocare Innovations, Edmonds, Washington, USA). It has been in publication since 1977 and is currently published by SAGE Publications on behalf of International Society for Prosthetics and Orthotics.

Scope 
Prosthetics and Orthotics International is aimed at all professionals who have an interest in the medical, clinical, rehabilitation and research aspects of prosthetics, orthotics and rehabilitation engineering and their related topics. The journal is multidisciplinary and publishes review articles, experimental and clinical research papers.

Abstracting and indexing 
 Prosthetics and Orthotics International  is abstracted and indexed in, among other databases:  SCOPUS, and the Sciences Citation Index. According to the Journal Citation Reports, its 2018 impact factor is 1.482, ranking it 37 out of 65 journals in the category ‘Rehabilitation’. and 50 out of 76 journals in the category "Orthopedics".

References

External links 
 
 

SAGE Publishing academic journals
English-language journals